Ross Cockrell (born August 6, 1991) is an American football cornerback who is a free agent. He was drafted by the Buffalo Bills in the fourth round of the 2014 NFL Draft. He played college football at Duke.

Early life
Cockrell was born on August 6, 1991, to Serena and Kieth Cockrell. His father was a college athlete and played football for Columbia University. His younger sister, Anna, is a sprinter and hurdler who competed in the 2020 Summer Olympics.

Cockrell attended Walt Whitman High School in Bethesda, Maryland and later Charlotte Latin High School in Charlotte, North Carolina, where he was selected to the all-conference and all-state teams twice. In his senior season, he had 29 receptions for 459 yards and 11 TDs while posting 34 tackles and three INTs helping lead Latin to the state championship game.

He also ran for the Charlotte Latin High School track team. He won the 100 meters at the 2008 CISAA championships, with a career-best time of 10.88 seconds. Also a top competitor in the 400 meters, he won the NCISAA 3A State championships with a personal-best time of 48.42 seconds.

Considered a three-star recruit by Rivals.com, he was rated as the 76th best cornerback prospect of his class.

College career
In 2010, Cockrell was selected to the Freshman All-America third team by Phil Steele in his freshman season. He was named to the Academic All-ACC as a Freshman.
In his sophomore season, he was a recipient of the Sonny Falcone Iron Duke Award. He was an Honorable mention All-America by Sports Illustrated in his junior season. Cockrell was selected to the first team All-ACC following his junior season. He won the Willis Aldridge Award following his junior season in 2011. He was selected to the first team Capital One Academic All-District III also in his junior season. Also in his junior season, he was selected to the Academic All-ACC. He was selected to the consensus preseason first team All-ACC by Sporting News, Phil Steele’s College Football Preview, Lindy’s Sports, Athlon Sports and USA Today prior to his senior season. On May 16, 2013, Cockrell was named to Lott IMPACT Trophy Watch List prior to his senior season. Cockrell graduated from Duke that same month with a degree in political science and received a certificate in markets and management studies.

Professional career

Pre-draft
Entering the 2014 NFL Draft, many analysts and scouts had Cockrell projected as a third or fourth round draft choice. He was described as agile, consistent, aware, with good anticipation and a good feel for the game. The main issues that worried scouts were physical attributes like having small hands, a skinny lower body, thin frame, short arms, and his lack of strength during press coverage and taking on blocks. He attended the NFL combine in Indianapolis and was able to perform all the drills well. Although he had a good showing at the combine, Cockrell decided to participate in all the events during Duke's Pro Day. He was able to improve on all of his combine numbers, including a sub-4.40 in the 40-yard dash, 12 bench presses of 225 lbs, and a 39-inch vertical.

Buffalo Bills
Cockrell was selected in the fourth round with the 109th overall pick in the 2014 NFL Draft by the Buffalo Bills. It made him the highest Duke football player drafted since Lennie Friedman with the 61st selection of the 1999 NFL Draft. On May 15, 2014, the  Bills signed Cockrell to a four-year, $2.68 million rookie contract.

On August 31, 2015, Cockrell was released by the Bills.

Pittsburgh Steelers
On September 5, 2015, Cockrell signed with the Pittsburgh Steelers. Despite signing with the team five days before the opening game of the 2015 NFL season, he received significant playing time that year, beginning in the Steelers' second regular season game against the San Francisco 49ers. On October 1, 2015, he intercepted his first career pass from Baltimore Ravens' quarterback Joe Flacco and returned it for 37-yards. The following game, he collected a season-high 7 solo tackles against the San Diego Chargers. On the year, he played 62% of the Steelers' defensive snaps. During the regular season he recorded 44 tackles, 11 passes defensed, two interceptions, one forced fumble, and recovered one fumble. In his first season with the Steelers, Cockrell played in 15 regular season games, and started in seven of those.

On January 22, 2016, the Steelers signed Cockrell to a one-year contract extension worth $600,000. He began the season as the Steeler's second cornerback, opposite longtime veteran William Gay. In the season opener against the Washington Redskins, he made four combined tackles in the Steelers 38–16 victory. On October 9, 2016, Cockrell collected four solo tackles and three pass deflections during the Steelers 31–13 rout of the New York Jets. The following week, he made a season-high five solo tackles and two pass deflections in a 15–30 loss to the Miami Dolphins. On November 13, 2016, he made four solo tackles, an assisted tackle, and a pass deflection during a 35–30 loss to the Dallas Cowboys. Three days later, he was fined $9,115 for a late hit against Lucky Whitehead during the loss to the Cowboys.

On December 25, 2016, Cockrell recorded a season-high seven combined tackles as the Steelers defeated the Baltimore Ravens 31–27 and clinched the AFC North. He finished the 2016 season with a career-high 62 combined tackles, 14 pass deflections, and 16 regular season starts. On January 8, 2017, Cockrell started in his first career postseason game and made eight solo tackles in a 30–12 AFC wild card game victory over the Miami Dolphins.

New York Giants
On September 2, 2017, Cockrell was traded to the New York Giants after the Pittsburgh Steelers signed cornerback Joe Haden
after his release by the Cleveland Browns.

Carolina Panthers
On March 23, 2018, Cockrell signed a two-year contract with the Carolina Panthers. During training camp on July 30, 2018, Cockrell suffered a broken left tibia and fibula which required surgery. He was placed on injured reserve two days later.

In Week 3 of the 2019 season against the Houston Texans, Cockrell intercepted a pass thrown by wide receiver DeAndre Hopkins and returned it for 37 yards in the 16–10 win. In Week 6 against the Tampa Bay Buccaneers, Cockrell intercepted a pass from Jameis Winston in the 37–26 win.

After becoming a free agent in March 2020, Cockrell visited the New York Giants on August 8, 2020, but did not sign with the team.

Tampa Bay Buccaneers

On September 23, 2020, Cockrell was signed to the Tampa Bay Buccaneers practice squad. He was elevated to the active roster on October 8 for the team's week 5 game against the Chicago Bears, and reverted to the practice squad after the game. He was promoted to the active roster on October 13, 2020. Cockrell played in all four games in the Buccaneers' playoff run that resulted in the team winning Super Bowl LV.

Cockrell re-signed with the Buccaneers on April 13, 2021. He was released on August 16, 2022.

References

External links
Tampa Bay Buccaneers bio
Duke Blue Devils bio

1991 births
Living people
Players of American football from Michigan
People from Farmington Hills, Michigan
American football cornerbacks
Duke Blue Devils football players
Buffalo Bills players
Pittsburgh Steelers players
New York Giants players
Carolina Panthers players
Tampa Bay Buccaneers players